Quneitra Subdistrict is a Syrian nahiyah (subdistrict) that administratively belongs to Al Quneitra Governorate.

References 

Quneitra District
Subdistricts of Syria